Prusinowice  (German Waltdorf) is a village in the administrative district of Gmina Pakosławice, within Nysa County, Opole Voivodeship, in south-western Poland.

Notable residents
 Emanuel Sperner (1905–1980), German mathematician

References

Prusinowice